Pelageya Yakovlevna Polubarinova-Kochina (– 3 July 1999) was a Soviet and Russian applied mathematician, known for her work on fluid mechanics and hydrodynamics, particularly, the application of Fuchsian equations, as well in the history of mathematics. She was elected a corresponding member of the Academy of Sciences of the Soviet Union in 1946 and full member (academician) in 1958.

Biography

She studied at a women's high school in Saint Petersburg and went on to Petrograd University (after the Russian Revolution). After her father died in 1918, she started working at the laboratory of geophysics under the supervision of Alexander Friedmann. There she met Nikolai Kochin; they were married in 1925 and had two daughters. The two taught at Petrograd University until 1934, when they moved to Moscow, where Nikolai Kochin took a teaching position at the Moscow University. In Moscow, Polubarinova-Kochina did research at the Steklov Institute until World War II, when she and their daughters were evacuated to Kazan while Kochin stayed in Moscow to work on aiding the military effort. He died before the war was over.

After the war, she edited his lectures and continued to teach applied mathematics. She was later head of the department of theoretical mechanics at the University of Novosibirsk and director of the department of applied hydrodynamics at the Hydrodynamics Institute. She was one of the founders of the Siberian Branch of the Russian Academy of Sciences (then the Academy of Sciences of the Soviet Union) at Novosibirsk.

She was awarded the Stalin Prize in 1946, was made a Hero of Socialist Labour in 1969 and received the Order of Friendship of Peoples in 1979. She died in 1999, a few months after her 100th birthday, and shortly after publishing her last scientific article.

Selected publications

Fluid mechanics

 , translated as

History of mathematics

 , translated as

Notes

References

External links
 "Pelageya Yakovlevna Polubarinova-Kochina", Biographies of Women Mathematicians, Agnes Scott College
 

1899 births
1999 deaths
20th-century Russian mathematicians
20th-century women mathematicians
People from Astrakhan Governorate
Full Members of the Russian Academy of Sciences
Full Members of the USSR Academy of Sciences
Academic staff of Novosibirsk State University
Members of the Supreme Soviet of the Russian Soviet Federative Socialist Republic, 1951–1955
Members of the Supreme Soviet of the Russian Soviet Federative Socialist Republic, 1955–1959
Heroes of Socialist Labour
Stalin Prize winners
Recipients of the Order "For Merit to the Fatherland", 3rd class
Recipients of the Order of Friendship of Peoples
Recipients of the Order of Lenin
Recipients of the Order of the Red Banner of Labour
Russian centenarians
Russian mathematicians
Soviet women mathematicians
Women centenarians
Burials at Novodevichy Cemetery